is a Japanese condominium builder. There are about 2000 condominiums under the Dia Palace brand. The company filed for bankruptcy protection in December 2008.

References

External links 
 Dia Kensetsu corporate website 
 Dia Palace brand 

Construction and civil engineering companies based in Tokyo
Companies formerly listed on the Tokyo Stock Exchange
Construction and civil engineering companies disestablished in 2008
Japanese companies disestablished in 2008